The 1981 NCAA Division II football season, part of college football in the United States organized by the National Collegiate Athletic Association at the Division II level, began in August 1981, and concluded with the NCAA Division II Football Championship on December 12, 1981, at McAllen Veterans Memorial Stadium in McAllen, Texas. During the game's five-year stretch in McAllen, the "City of Palms", it was referred to as the Palm Bowl.

Southwest Texas State defeated North Dakota State in the championship game, 42–13, to win their first Division II national title.

Conference realignment

Conference changes
Prior to the 1981 season, the Mid-Continent Conference was shifted from Division II to Division I-AA; its four members, Eastern Illinois, Northern Iowa, Western Illinois, and Southwest Missouri State (now Missouri State), all made the transition. Northern Michigan and Youngstown State, who had been members of the Mid-Continent the previous season, departed the league before the shift. NMU remained in Division II while YSU departed for the Ohio Valley Conference in Division I-AA.

Membership changes

Conference standings

Conference summaries

Postseason

The 1981 NCAA Division II Football Championship playoffs were the ninth single-elimination tournament to determine the national champion of men's NCAA Division II college football. The championship game was held at McAllen Veterans Memorial Stadium in McAllen, Texas, for the first time.

Playoff bracket

See also
 1981 NCAA Division I-A football season
 1981 NCAA Division I-AA football season
 1981 NCAA Division III football season
1981 NAIA Division I football season
1981 NAIA Division II football season

References